John Carson (born 8 July 1945) is a New Zealand former cricketer. He played first-class cricket for Auckland and Northern Districts between 1963 and 1974.

See also
 List of Auckland representative cricketers

References

External links
 

1945 births
Living people
New Zealand cricketers
Auckland cricketers
Northern Districts cricketers
Cricketers from Auckland